Current seminaries of the Evangelical Lutheran Church in America (ELCA):
Luther Seminary  (Saint Paul, Minnesota)
Lutheran School of Theology at Chicago
United Lutheran Seminary (Gettysburg and Philadelphia, Pennsylvania)
Lutheran Theological Southern Seminary (Columbia, South Carolina): merged with Lenoir–Rhyne University, an ELCA University
Pacific Lutheran Theological Seminary (Berkeley, California)
Trinity Lutheran Seminary (Columbus, Ohio): merged with Capital University, an ELCA University
Wartburg Theological Seminary (Dubuque, Iowa)

In addition, the ELCA sponsors the following seminary education programs, which are not on the campus of an ELCA seminary:
Lutheran Seminary Program in the Southwest  (Austin, Texas)
Lutheran Theological Center in Atlanta (Georgia)

Former seminaries of the Evangelical Lutheran Church in America:
 Lutheran Theological Seminary at Gettysburg (Gettysburg, Pennsylvania): merged with Lutheran Theological Seminary at Philadelphia to form United Lutheran Seminary
 Lutheran Theological Seminary at Philadelphia (Philadelphia, Pennsylvania): merged with Lutheran Theological Seminary at Gettysburg to form United Lutheran Seminary

References

ELCA
 
ELCA seminaries